Galina Tancheva (born 18 May 1987 in Varna) is a retired Bulgarian rhythmic gymnast. She contributed to a silver medal effort for the Bulgarian squad in the group all-around at the 2003 World Rhythmic Gymnastics Championships in Budapest, Hungary, and later added a bronze to her career hardware in the same program at the 2004 Summer Olympics in Athens. Tancheva is also the twin sister of fellow rhythmic gymnast Vladislava Tancheva.

Career
Tancheva made her official debut, along with her twin sister Vladislava, at the 2003 World Rhythmic Gymnastics Championships in Budapest, Hungary, where she captured the silver medal for the Bulgarian squad in the group all-around tournament with a composite score of 50.175.

At the 2004 Summer Olympics in Athens, Tancheva competed for the Bulgarian women's rhythmic gymnastics team in the group all-around tournament, after receiving a qualifying berth from the World Championships. Teaming with Zhaneta Ilieva, Eleonora Kezhova, Zornitsa Marinova, Kristina Rangelova, and her twin sister Vladislava in the competition, Tancheva performed a double routine using five ribbons (23.400) and a combination of three hoops and two balls (25.200) to deliver the Bulgarian squad a bronze-medal score in 48.600.

See also
 List of Olympic medalists in gymnastics (women)

References

External links
 
 
 

1987 births
Living people
Bulgarian rhythmic gymnasts
Gymnasts at the 2004 Summer Olympics
Medalists at the 2004 Summer Olympics
Olympic gymnasts of Bulgaria
Olympic bronze medalists for Bulgaria
Olympic medalists in gymnastics
Sportspeople from Varna, Bulgaria
Medalists at the Rhythmic Gymnastics World Championships